Aloïs Wouters (born 17 August 1962) is a Belgian former professional racing cyclist. He rode in the 1985 Tour de France.

References

External links
 

1962 births
Living people
Belgian male cyclists
People from Mol, Belgium
Sportspeople from Antwerp Province